Future Shock is a bestselling 1970 book by futurist Alvin Toffler.

Future Shock may also refer to:

Music
 "Future Shock", a song by Curtis Mayfield released on the 1973 album Back to the World
 "Future Shock", a 1974 single from the album The Handsome Devils by Hello People
 "Future Shock (Dance Your Pants Off)", a 1975 single recorded by Maceo Parker and written by James Brown as the theme for his 1976 TV series
 Future Shock (EP), a 1980 EP by The Gordons
 Future Shock, a 1981 album by Gillan
 Future Shock, a 1983 album by Herbie Hancock
 "Future Shock", a song by Stanley Clarke from the 1984 album Time Exposure
 Future Shock, the 1985 reissue of the 1980 New Wave compilation album Hicks from the Sticks
 "Future Shock", a song by White Zombie from the 1987 album Soul-Crusher
 "Future Shock", a song by Stratovarius from the 1989 album Fright Night
 "Future Shock", a song by William Brittelle from the 2012 album "Loving the Chambered Nautilus"

Film and television
 Future Shock (film), a 1972 documentary film on Toffler's book
 Future Shock (TV series), a music and dance variety show hosted by James Brown from 1976 to 1978
 "Future Shock", an episode of Mega Man
 "Future Shock", an episode of Godzilla: The Series
 "Future Shock" (Static Shock), the opening episode of the fourth season of Static Shock
 "Future Shock", an episode of My Life as a Teenage Robot
 "Future Shock", a season four episode of Totally Spies!
 "Future Shock" (FlashForward), the series finale of the science fiction series FlashForward
 Future Shock! The Story of 2000AD, a 2015 documentary about the history of British comic 2000AD

Other
 Tharg's Future Shocks, short stories in the comic 2000 AD
 The Terminator: Future Shock, 1995 computer game in the Terminator franchise
 "Ultraverse Future Shock", a Malibu Comics one-shot
 Future Shock (play), a 2011 play by Richard Stockwell